Statehood Day is an annual public holiday and national day celebrated on 30 May in Croatia to celebrate the constitution of the first modern multi-party Croatian Parliament in 1990. As a national day and public holiday, it is a non-working day for all government employees and majority of labour force based in Croatia.

While there are no strict or established forms of celebration associated with the holiday, it is usually celebrated outdoors. The day is usually marked by family reunions, picnics, barbecues, flag-raising and national anthem-playing ceremonies and by civilian and military parades on quinquennial or decennial anniversaries.

History 
On 30 May 1990, the first modern multi-party Croatian Parliament convened, following the 1990 Croatian parliamentary election. This date was from 1990 to 2002 marked as the Statehood Day. The Government of Ivica Račan moved the Statehood Day to 25 June in 2002, and 30 May was marked as a memorial day (working) under the name Day of the Croatian Parliament. On 25 June, after the independence referendum held on 19 May 1991, Croatia proclaimed its independence, but due to the negotiation of the Brioni Agreement, a three-month moratorium was placed on the implementation of the decision and the Parliament cut all remaining ties with Yugoslavia on 8 October 1991. 8 October was a holiday, Independence Day from 2002 to 2019, when it was declared a memorial day (working).

Slovenia declared independence from Yugoslavia at the same time, and its Statehood Day coincided with the Croatian Statehood Day, on 25 June. On 14 November 2019, the Croatian Parliament adopted a new law on holidays, and moved Statehood Day back to 30 May. Previous date, 25 June, was attributed to Independence Day, which became a working memorial day, itself moved from 8 October.

Activities and celebrations 
Typical state activities on the occasion involve speeches by the President of Croatia and other dignitaries, as well as commemoration of the Croatian War of Independence. The first military parade of the Armed Forces of Croatia took place in the neighborhood of Jarun in 1995.

See also 
 Statehood Day in other countries
 Holidays in Croatia
 History of Croatia
 Croatian War of Independence

References 

Public holidays in Croatia
May observances
National days